Tyron Akins (born 6 January 1986) is a US-born hurdler competing internationally for Nigeria. He switched allegiance from his country of birth to Nigeria in 2014  and has since won several medals on the continental level.

His personal bests are 13.25 seconds in the 110 metres hurdles (+0.4, Des Moines 2008) and 7.60 seconds in the 60 metres hurdles (Liévin 2009).

Competition record

References

1986 births
Living people
American male hurdlers
Nigerian male hurdlers
Athletes (track and field) at the 2014 Commonwealth Games
Athletes (track and field) at the 2015 African Games
People from Bainbridge, Georgia
African Games bronze medalists for Nigeria
African Games medalists in athletics (track and field)
Commonwealth Games competitors for Nigeria